Wilmots is a surname. Notable people with the surname include:

 Marc Wilmots (born 1969), Belgian footballer and manager
 Marten Wilmots (born 1999), Belgian footballer
 Reno Wilmots (born 1997), Belgian footballer